Gbi-Godenu is a divisional chieftaincy of the traditional area of Hohoe recognized within of the Constitution of Ghana and legislation regulating the "Headquarters" in Ghanaian society. It is located in the Volta River region of Ghana.

The current traditional chief of Godenu is Togbe Osei III. He is owes allegiance to the Fiaga of Gbi.

Name Godenu means Be Steadfast with God.

The Gbi-Godenu area covers 18 square kilometers with approximately 13,000 inhabitants in four places near Hohoe.

Talking River 

A tourist attraction and enigmatic symbol of Godenu is the so-called "Talking River". According to tradition the river communicates with the ancients, the togbe (even those of the neighboring towns and cities) and other persons of "strong spirit" and in a sort of oracle points the way forward, including for the future of the town of Godenu itself .
Another attraction of the river is its small islets, some with denser vegetation cover and others made of stones, which give the landscape its shape.

Dynastic orders 

As a way of raising funds and materials for the development of the village of Godenu (urbanized area of the "chieftaincy"), Togbe established a small honorific system of European inspiration for the village.
The reigning togbe grants two insignias in recognition of the faithful followers of the chief, making them honorary knights or dames:

 The Royal Order of the Elephant of Godenu is granted in three classes, often as a hereditary award.
 The Royal Order of the Lion of Godenu is awarded in five classes. The Order may be granted as a non-hereditary or hereditary award. The order is rarely granted as an hereditary award and only in the form of a Grand Cross.

Also, there is a Help Godenu Medal of Merit since 2016.

Help Godenu 

Help Godenu - Help for Godenu "is a non-profit association dedicated to the education, health and peaceful coexistence of religions in the Kingdom of Godenu.

External links 

 http://www.royalgodenu.org
 https://help-godenu.org/

References 

Geography of Ghana